Sarapul (Udmurt and ) is a city and a river port in the Udmurt Republic, Russia, located on the right bank of the Kama River,  southeast of Izhevsk, the capital of the republic. Population:

History
Sarapul is one of the oldest cities of the Kama region. Apparently, here Sarapul is the name of a section of the river, as well as the entire area along its shores. It is believed that the name of this area comes from the word  which in Chuvash means 'yellow fish', or sturgeon, which was in abundance here. Later, however, other versions of the origin of the name were considered.

It was chartered in 1780 and by the end of the 18th century had grown into a merchant town with developed footwear manufacturing industry.

The city of Sarapul was one of the residence centers of the Udmurt Jews, who spoke Udmurtish Yiddish. In the lexicon of this dialect there was a noticeable number of Udmurt and Tatar loan words.

Geography

Climate

Administrative and municipal status
Within the framework of administrative divisions, it is incorporated as the city of republic significance of Sarapul—an administrative unit with the status equal to that of the districts. As a municipal division, the city of republic significance of Sarapul is incorporated as Sarapul Urban Okrug.

Economy
Currently, Sarapul is the second most important industrial town in the republic after Izhevsk.

Honors
The asteroid 26851 Sarapul was named by astronomer Eric Elst in the city's honor on June 1, 2007.

Notable people from Sarapul
 Ruslan Avleev, basketball player
 Zulya Kamalova, singer
 Yevgeny Kychanov, historian
 Peter Palchinsky, engineer
 Vladimir Sarayev, football player
 Oleg Zhakov, actor

References

Notes

Sources

This article incorporates material from the Russian Wikipedia

External links
Website of Sarapul 
Website Sarapul production of metal products 

Cities and towns in Udmurtia
Sarapulsky Uyezd
Populated places on the Kama River